The Argentina women's national 3x3 team is a national basketball team of Argentina, governed by the Confederación Argentina de Basquetbol.
It represents the country in international 3x3 (3 against 3) women's basketball competitions.

See also
Argentina men's national 3x3 team
Argentina mixed national 3x3 team

References

3
Women's national 3x3 basketball teams